1200 may refer to:

 1200 (number)

Dates
 1200 CE (MCC), a year in the Western calendar, "A.D. 1200"
 1200s (decade), the decade from 1200CE to 1210CE
 1200s (century), the 13th century, from 1200CE to 1300CE
 1200 BC, a year in the Western calendar, "1200 BCE"
 1200s BC (decade), the decade from 1200BCE to 1210BCE
 1200s BC (century), the 13th century BCE, from 1200BCE to 1300BCE

Places
 1200 Imperatrix 1931 RH (asteroid 1200), main belt asteroid

 Louisiana Highway 1200
 A1200 road (UK) in London, England

Other uses
 Amiga 1200, the 1200 model Amiga personal computer
 Ventura 1200, ultralight airplane
 Škoda 1200, the Czechoslovakian car
 Datsun 1200, the Japanese car
 Fiat 1200, the Italian car
 Winchester Model 1200 the pump-action shotgun
 Noon in 24-hour clock

See also
 
 
 MCC (disambiguation)
 1200s (disambiguation)
 AM1200 (disambiguation)
 1200 series (disambiguation)